Hasli is a Swiss toponym. It may refer to:

the Oberhasli region in the Bernese Oberland
a village in Muri, AG
Niederhasli